The Special Security Force (SSF)  is a Bangladeshi law enforcement agency that provides protection to government officials and foreign dignitaries.

Responsibility
The mission of the SSF is to provide physical security to the President and Prime Minister of Bangladesh, and any person designated as a very important person (VIP) by the Government of Bangladesh. The SSF takes necessary measures in coordination with the civil administration and security and intelligence organizations to prevent future threats to VIPs and protect VIPs from active threats. The SSF is also responsible for the security of VIPs’ offices and residences.

History
The idea of establishing a security force in Bangladesh for physical protection of VIPs was first mooted by the then-President Hussain Muhammad Ershad. Accordingly, the Presidential Security Force (PSF) was formed on 15 June 1986. Later, with the introduction of a parliamentary system of government in Bangladesh, the force was renamed as the Special Security Force on 27 September 1991.

The Presidential Security Force Ordinance (PSFO) established a security force which is to be under the direct command of the president and controlled and administered by a director, who may be invested with the powers of the Chief of Army Staff in respect of operations of the SSF. The force may seek the assistance of other services, such as law enforcement agencies, paramilitary forces and defence and intelligence agencies.

The force was originally intended to provide physical security, both to the president wherever they may be and to VIPs, including any head of state or government or any person declared to be a VIP by the government. Following restoration of the parliamentary system, it was renamed the Special Security Force, whose primary function is to protect the prime minister, the president and other VIPs. Its work also includes "collecting and communicating intelligence affecting the physical security of the prime minister, the president or a VIP" (Section 8).

The SSF is now accountable to the prime minister under the present parliamentary system, and is given the power to "arrest without warrant...any person when there is reason to believe that the presence or movement of such person at or near the place where the prime minister, the president or a VIP is living or staying or through which he is passing or about to pass is prejudicial to the physical security of the prime minister, the president or such VIP; and if such person forcibly resists the endeavor to arrest him or attempts to evade arrest, such officer may use all means necessary to effect the arrest and may, if necessary and after giving such warning as may be appropriate in the circumstances of the case or otherwise so, use force against him as to cause death" (Section 8).

The wide and unfettered powers granted to the authorities above under the Special Security Force Ordinance (SSFO) enacted in 1986 are exacerbated by Section 11, which prevents prosecution for such acts without government sanction.

Members of the SSF are referred to as Agents, and are officers from the Bangladesh Army, Navy, Air Force, Police, Ansar and the Village Defence Party. Persons from other ranks also actively support the organization.

Organization

The SSF Headquarters is located at the Prime Minister's Office in Tejgaon, Dhaka. The SSF maintains an independent training complex and accommodations of its own, co-located near the headquarters.

Commanded by a director-general (equivalent in rank to a brigadier general or major general), the SSF is organized into five administrative bureaus:
 Tactical Support Team
 Operation and Protection Bureau
 Intelligence Bureau
 Logistics Bureau
 Training Bureau

List of Director General of Special Security Force

References

External links
 
 Amendment of Special Security Force Ordinance XLIII of 1986
 BANGLADESH: National Security Laws Security for Whom?

Protective security units
Law enforcement in Bangladesh
1986 establishments in Bangladesh
Bangladeshi intelligence agencies
Military of Bangladesh
Government agencies of Bangladesh